The Frostburg Historic District is a national historic district in Frostburg, Allegany County, Maryland.  It comprises 356 resources within the city of Frostburg, along U.S. Route 40, which forms the main axis of the district. Included are a collection of early-20th century commercial buildings, primarily of brick construction, two or three stories tall, and a collection of mid- to late-19th and early-20th century homes reflecting a variety of architectural styles, including Italianate, Second Empire, Queen Anne, and Colonial Revival.

It was listed on the National Register of Historic Places in 1983.

References

External links
, including photo in 2002, at Maryland Historical Trust
Boundary Map of the Frostburg Historic District, Allegany County, at Maryland Historical Trust

Frostburg, Maryland
Historic districts on the National Register of Historic Places in Maryland
Historic districts in Allegany County, Maryland
National Register of Historic Places in Allegany County, Maryland